Centrache is a comune and town in the province of Catanzaro in the Calabria region of Italy.

History
During the 1908 Messina earthquake, buildings and other structures throughout Centrache were destroyed; 80,000 people were killed.

References

External links
 

Cities and towns in Calabria